Mountainview may refer to:

 Auburn Mountainview High School, a senior high school in Auburn, Washington, United States
 Camp Mountainview, a Salvation Army camp near Houston in British Columbia, Canada
 Mountainview College, a community of residence halls at Binghamton University
 Mountainview High School, a co-educational state high school in Timaru, New Zealand
 Mountainview International Christian School, a private, Christian, international school located in Salatiga, Central Java, Indonesia
 Mountainview Montessori School, a public elementary school in Surrey, British Columbia, Canada
 Mountainview (electoral district), a territorial district in the Yukon.
 Mountainview, Mercer County, New Jersey, an unincorporated community in the United States.

See also

 Mountain View (disambiguation)